Adam Raga (born 6 April 1982) in Ulldecona, province of Tarragona, Catalonia, Spain) is a Spanish Motorcycle trials racer.

Has won 4 Indoor World Championships and 2 Outdoor World Championships.

Sporting achievements
 1999 - 2nd in the European Championship (280 cc)
 2000 - Junior world champion (280 cc) and European champion (280 cc) 
 2001 - Nations world champion
 2003 - Trial Indoor World champion (280 cc) and 4th in the Trial Outdoor World Championship
 2004 - Trial Indoor World champion (300 cc) and 3rd in the Trial Outdoor World Championship 
 2005 - Trial Indoor World champion (300 cc) and Trial Outdoor World champion   
 2006 - Trial Indoor World champion (300 cc) and Trial Outdoor World Champion
 2007 - 2nd place in the Trial Indoor World Championship -  2nd place in the Trial Outdoor World Championship.
 2008 - 2nd place in the Trial Indoor World Championship -  2nd place in the Trial Outdoor World Championship.
 2009 - 2nd place in the Trial Indoor World Championship -  3nd place in the Trial Outdoor World Championship.
 2010 - 2nd place in the Trial Indoor World Championship -  3nd place in the Trial Outdoor World Championship.
 2011 - 2nd place in the Trial Indoor World Championship -  3nd place in the Trial Outdoor World Championship.
 2012 - 2nd place in the Trial Indoor World Championship -  3nd place in the Trial Outdoor World Championship.
 2013 - 2nd place in the Trial Indoor World Championship -  2nd place in the Trial Outdoor World Championship.

Titles 
 2 World Motorcycle Trials Champion (2005, 2006)
4 World Motorcycle Trials Indoor Champion (2003, 2004, 2005, 2006)
 6 Spanish Trials Champion (2004, 2005, 2007, 2008, 2010, 2020)
 4 Spanish Trials Indoor Champion (2003, 2004, 2005, 2007)
 16 Trial des Nations (2001, 2004, 2005, 2006, 2007, 2008, 2009, 2010, 2011, 2012, 2013, 2014, 2015, 2016, 2017, 2021)

World Motorcycle Trials Results

World Indoor Trials Championship Careers

References

External links

Official website

1982 births
Living people
Motorcycle racers from Catalonia
Spanish motorcycle racers
Motorcycle trials riders